Phil(l)ip or Phil Morris may refer to:

Companies
Altria, a conglomerate company previously known as Philip Morris Companies Inc., named after the tobacconist
Philip Morris USA, a tobacco company wholly owned by Altria Group
Philip Morris International, a tobacco company that spun off from Altria Group in 2008
Philip Morris (cigarette)

Film and TV
Philip Morris (1893–1949), American actor, known for his role in Home on the Range
Phil Morris (actor) (born 1959), American actor, best known for his role on Seinfeld
Philip Morris (archivist), English media recovery expert, known for recovering Doctor Who episodes

Sportspeople
Philip Morris (English cricketer) (1877–1945), English cricketer
Philip Morris (New Zealand cricketer) (born 1952), New Zealand cricketer
Philip Morris (racing driver) (born 1965), American short track racing racer
Phil Morris (speedway rider) (born 1975), British motorcycle speedway rider and TV game show participant

Others
Philip Morris (tobacconist) (1835–1873), British tobacconist and importer of cigarettes
Phil Morris (health activist) (born 1972), British health activist and cancer survivor
Philip Morris (priest) (born 1950), Archdeacon of Margam
Philip Richard Morris (1836–1902), English painter
Phillip Morris, prisoner, and lover of conman and escape artist Steven Jay Russell
Phillip Morris Napier, American politician in the state of Maine
Naugle v. Philip Morris, a 2009 court case

See also
I Love You Phillip Morris, a 2009 film adaptation of a book inspired by the lives of Morris and Russell

Morris, Philip